Apolonia Vaivai  (born 5 February 1991) is a Fijian weightlifter. She competed in the women's 75 kg event at the 2014 Commonwealth Games where she won a bronze medal. In 2016, she won gold at the Oceania Weightlifting Championships in the 69 kg event. She won a bronze medal again in the 2018 Commonwealth Games.

Medalbox note

References

External links

1991 births
Living people
Fijian female weightlifters
Commonwealth Games bronze medallists for Fiji
Weightlifters at the 2014 Commonwealth Games
People from Taveuni
I-Taukei Fijian people
Weightlifters at the 2016 Summer Olympics
Olympic weightlifters of Fiji
Commonwealth Games medallists in weightlifting
Weightlifters at the 2018 Commonwealth Games
20th-century Fijian women
21st-century Fijian women
Medallists at the 2014 Commonwealth Games
Medallists at the 2018 Commonwealth Games